Two Teardrops is the fifteenth studio album by American country music singer Steve Wariner. Released in 1999, it was his second studio album for Capitol Nashville.  The album, which was certified gold in the United States, produced two singles for Wariner on the Billboard country charts in 1999: "I'm Already Taken" at number 3 and the title track at number 2. The former was originally recorded by Wariner in 1978, and was a number 63-peaking single for him on the country charts that year.

Track listing

Personnel
Compiled from liner notes.

 Eddie Bayers — drums
 Jerry Douglas — dobro
 Stuart Duncan — fiddle
 Paul Franklin — steel guitar
 Ron Gannaway — drums, percussion
 John Gardner — drums on "Tattoos of Life"
 Sonny Garrish — steel guitar
 Derek George — slide guitar, background vocals
 Hoot Hester — fiddle
 Marcus Hummon — acoustic guitar on "Cry No More"
 John Barlow Jarvis — piano, synthesizer
 Paul Leim — drums
 Woody Lingle — bass guitar
 Terry McMillan — harmonica
 Brent Mason — electric guitar
 Nashville String Machine — strings
 Steve Nathan — organ, synthesizer
 Michael Rhodes — bass guitar
 Tom Roady — percussion
 Matt Rollings — piano, synthesizer
 Harry Stinson — background vocals
 Bobby Taylor — oboe
 Ryan Wariner — electric guitar on "So Much"
 Steve Wariner — lead vocals, background vocals, acoustic guitar, electric guitar
 Terry Wariner — background vocals
 Bryan White — vocals on "Talk to Her Heart"
 Glenn Worf — upright bass
 Reggie Young — electric guitar
 Andrea Zonn — background vocals

String arrangements by Bergen White, conducted by Carl Gorodetzky.

Charts

Weekly charts

Year-end charts

References

1999 albums
Capitol Records albums
Steve Wariner albums